Mental health refers to a person's mental state, well-being, and ability to cope with the daily stresses of life. Good mental health also means that one has the ability to be mentally resilient, have a good life balance, having an absence of mental disorders and the ability to enjoy life. Elite athletes such as those competing in the Australian Football League(AFL), are at higher risk of developing a mental health disorders such as depression, anxiety, social anxiety, panic attacks and eating disorders. 16–34 years olds are also in the high risk category, which is the average age of a football player and extends to those who are being drafted, this puts AFL players in both high risk categories. A study conducted by Helen Christensen and Alison Parsons showed that 1 in 5 elite athletes suffered depressive symptoms. Playing elite sports is a great challenge emotionally, mentally as well as physically, some players can cope with all of these pressures while others cannot handle it and therefore suffer from a lack of mental health.

Australian rules football is a physically demanding and mentally draining, especially for the professional players in the AFL. Many are looked at as super human like characters who bare no mental scars, getting paid to play 'footy'.  However, with living and playing in the spotlight of success hungry clubs and fans, comes expectation of consistent performances whilst juggling the life of being a regular human being and they are faced with the same mental health issues such as depression, as many other ordinary citizens. Depression effects almost 3 million Australians, and is currently the leading cause of non-fatal disabilities in Australia but only 3% of the Australian population regard it as a major health issue. Approximately 1 in 6 men will suffer from depression at some point in their lives, to add to that, depression is also most prevalent in young adults. In 2011, 101 AFL players sought psychological help through the various forums available to them. Many were due to a relocation to a new club or interstate, with the most common age for referral being just 19 years of age. However other provocatives may be injury, lack of form, poor treatment from the general public on social media and the inability to adapt to the life of being a professional athlete. Many players find it hard to adjust to the life which is so heavily scrutinised where their every move is monitored and judged. Players who have admitted and battled depression have stated that it is the lifestyle in which that live and that they hid behind this lifestyle.

Society and culture
AFL players are often forced to conform to the norms but also have high expectations placed on them such as extraordinary behavior, appearance and performance. They are perceived to be tough, and mentally tough, if they conform to these norms and display qualities such as having self-belief, mental and emotional resilience and a tough attitude. They are also expected to be extremely masculine and not show signs of emotional stress and upset, if they show these signs they are then perceived as weak and tend to be dropped from the team or squad. Usually only 35% of elite athletes will seek help from a professional as they tend to believe they are alright and can get better by themselves. They tend to be worried about others finding out about these issues as there seems to be a social stigma that they are weak if they suffer from any of these problems. The masculine stereotypes associated with AFL players is a potential barrier for players to come out and talk about their mental health problems.

When a player exaggerates their negative performances or situations it often leads to mental health problems. Media has a big role in all of this. Players are constantly scrutinized about performance, the way they act, the way they look, etc., and the players then see this and tend to dwell on all of the negatives. This messes with the players psychologically and places an added pressure on them to perform and act better.

History
There have been a few cases made public of AFL players suffering from mental health problems. In 2015 it was noted that Mitch Clark from Geelong Football Club has been suffering from mental health problems. When questioned it was not spoken about very much and all quite hidden. He was withdrawn from the team even after a huge win which sparked conversation in the community but Mitch Clarke never spoke much about it.

Also in 2015 Adam Goodes took a week off training and playing because of the 'emotional toll' he was put under during the season, receiving boos and racist comments from the crowd. He was also under analyses by the media which was all too much for him so it led to him taking time off and away from the sport.

Barry Hall was also seen to be suffering mental health problems, admitting he had been suffering depression throughout his AFL career and that he "had nothing to get out of bed for" (Hall, 2011). Simon Hogan was another player who came out about their depression and had contemplated killing himself during his career. Lance Picioane who played for Adelaide, Hawthorn and the Kangaroos said how he struggled to understand that he was actually suffering from depression and that it wasn't him just feeling a little bit down.

Wayne Schwass, Nathan Thompson and Heath Black are other players who have come out and spoken about their struggle with anxiety and depression throughout their football careers.

Causes
There are many factors that lead to bad mental health in AFL players.

Pressures and expectations
Pressure to win and to perform well week in and week out contributes to the bad mental state of some AFL players. Having such a heavy burden on their shoulders impacts their state of mind, and when they do under perform this can negatively affect a players mental health. There are also pressures from society to act professionally and look the part, be fit, strong and well groomed. They have high expectations on them as players and are encouraged to be the ideal male who is masculine, athletic, strong etc.. and this pressure is coming from within the club as well. If a player has a bad game it is written all over the media and it is hard for it not to affect the player emotionally.

Injuries
Injury and the risk of injury also contributes to this lack of mental health because if a player does become injured they will have a lower or no income and their position in next season is on the rocks so knowing this makes them stress. Being injured also means they cannot exercise as much and this sudden drop in physical activity levels makes the player more likely to become anxious or depressed as physical activity is a mood enhancer. On average a total of 40 players miss a total of 142 games a season. This is a huge number and a constant lingering concern for players. The whole process of finding out about their injury to rehabilitation and returning to the sport is an emotional roller-coaster for players as they have strong negative feelings when they find out about their diagnosis, to struggling through rehab then having the pressure to perform.

Head injuries may affect the mind more directly.

Other
The pressure of location and relocation is another toll on players. When drafting comes around young players are unsure what team will draft them. Having to relocate their entire lives to go train and play with a team is such a stress on the young players and can cause anxiety. Starting in a new team with new people, a new training structure and lifestyle can be a big shock to some players and they may experience social anxiety and exclusion which could lead to negative thoughts.

During the week each player is critiqued by coaching staff to see where they can improve in their game, but constantly being under the pump can be mentally exhausting for players.

The environment in which they live and train in impacts a players mental health as it can affect the mental resilience which they build and creates their personality which could affect if they fit in or not. It also affects their natural resiliency to tough situations and how they handle things that come their way. If they do not have support from either family or friends everything can fall apart.

Prevention and treatment 
Prevention, intervention and treatment for mental health has been neglected for quite some time and has never been a high priority to create groups to support this. 844 000 people commit suicide every year in the world so it is vital something is done to help the AFL players. It is shown that organised programs are one of the most effective ways to help treat mental illnesses such as depression and having a full-time staff member to facilitate this would be a greater benefit.

Many AFL clubs take the cautious approach to their players when it comes to mental issues such as Depression. An AFL club is very much a close knit environment where players become close with each other and support networks can be formed.  AFL clubs have in place a variety of avenues for their current players to use whilst dealing with the high profile and scrutinised lives that they are living. Club chaplains are one option a player can use, where they can go and discuss various issues within full confidence. AFL clubs also have 7 psychiatrists available around the country, where players can go and talk to about their issues or problems. Through the AFL Players Association or AFLPA, players are taught about the three main signs and symptoms of depression, they are sadness, lack of motivation towards activities they normally enjoy and becoming frequently more irritated. The AFLPA  has worked hard to better educate footballers on the signs and symptoms of Depression and trying to eliminate any social stigmas which may be attached to seeking help. An AFL club is very much a close knit environment where players become close with each other and support networks can be formed.

AFL mental health framework 
AFL has put a framework in place to ensure the best mental health of the players and it encourages early identification and intervention. They hope to remove any stigmas from society and the people involved in AFL about mental health disorders. They aim to educate their players on mental health issues with online, face to face and peer to peer programs. They are hoping to create a space where the industry is able to recognize symptoms and to aid in early intervention.

"Manage Your Mind" well-being program 
This is a program set up by the AFL Players Association, teaching players about the signs and symptoms of mental illness so they can better understand the difference between feeling a bit sad one day and depression. Through a three session course players are exposed to realizing their own values, different mental health stories and how these both relate back to their lives and then being able to change anything they aren't happy with. They are also taught about different emotions and ways to surface them and talk about them to other people.

AFL Players Association programs 
The AFL Players Association also have two other programs similar to the Manage Your Mind Well-being Program. Practical Mindfulness is another which is a hands on course that helps the players to be able to manage stress and build resilience to all the negative influences. Team wise is the third program they offer which is targeted  at coaching staff, captains and influential players to develop skills in aiding other players to speak up and to be positive role models.

Notable cases and people

Mitch Clark
Mitch Clark is one of the most publicised cases of depression amongst AFL athlete. Since being drafted to the Brisbane Lions at the age of 18, Mitch endured a string of injuries and illness, including battling Meningococcal disease prior to being drafted. From 2006- 2011, Mitch played a total of 82 games for Brisbane. Prior to the 2012 season, Mitch signed a lucrative 4-year deal with the Melbourne Demons Football Club, where he was handed the famous number 11 jersey which was worn by Melbourne legend, Jim Stynes. Mitch immediately felt the pressure of not only being one of the club's highest paid players, but also wearing a jumper number which had some much sentimental value to Melbourne fans. In his 2 years at Melbourne, Clark only managed to play 15 games. His career was again riddled by injury and prior to the 2014 season, Mitch retired from the AFL after battling depression which had hampered him for the previous 12 months. Clark was even granted indefinitely leave from Melbourne, however he could not continue to battle depression and play elite football. Prior to the 2015 season and after 12 months out of the game, Clark declared his desire to play top level football again, and although still being a Melbourne listed player, he requested a trade to the Geelong Football Club. Clarks time thus far at Geelong has been much the same as the rest of his career, he has been struck down by injury and still battles depression on a daily basis. In a game early in the 2015 season, Mitch broke down mid match against Collingwood. It remains unclear what may have triggered this event, Mitch posted the following message on his Facebook account after the event- "Depression makes very little sense and rears its head whenever it chooses and unfortunately last night was one of those times. Like I have said I’m nowhere near ‘cured’ and am still learning how to best deal with my dark days. I'm very fortunate to have such great support around me and grateful for all the messages I have received. Please if you're struggling, reach out and ask for help. You're not alone #youareloved." In another game in 2015, against Hawthorn, it was alleged that Clark had been on the receiving end of several sledges from Hawthorn players over his mental issues. Hawthorn denied any such events occurred and the matter was not taken any further by the AFL or the Geelong Football Club.

Simon Hogan

Simon Hogan played 22 games for the Geelong Cats between 2009- 2011. He abruptly called a time on his career after being diagnosed with a depressive disorder which he feared would impact his relationship with his team mates over the stereotype of living the 'Mach Man' lifestyle. At the depths of Hogan's issues he had suicidal thoughts, where he admits to holding sleeping tablets to his mouth a few times before he was interrupted by his father who happened to be home at the time. Hogan's biggest lifestyle adjustment was retiring from football, but he also had to make some other lifestyle changes as well. Hogan now wants to spend time to spread the awareness of depression amongst AFL players by telling his story. Hogan now spends his time studying whilst playing grassroots football on the weekends.

Post-career occurrence

Heath Black
Heath Black's battle with depression and other mental health issues wasn't publicised until later in his football career. Black played 192 AFL games from 1997-2008, where he played for two AFL clubs. Black linked his condition with the fact that all he knew how to do was play football, in year 11 he couldn't spell or do basic maths, so when that was taken from him, he had nothing to do with his life. This led to alcohol issues and violence episodes which again fuelled his depressive state of mind. Heath Black released a book detailing his issues titled, "Hell and Black" a s well as serving as a public and motivation speaker where he speaks on a range of topics ranging from how to deal with people with mental health issues to teamwork workshops.

Chris Mainwaring
Chris Mainwaring was a legend of the West Coast Eagles Football Club, he was also a sports reporter for Channel 7 in Perth. Mainwaring passed away in 2007 and it was revealed that he had a cocktail of both prescription and illicit drugs in his system. However, it was revealed in the days after Mainwaring's death, that Mainwaring had been battling depression after facing a lawsuit over a property deal went wrong. There had been several concerns over Mainwaring's health in the lead up to his death, with football figure Brad Hardie stating that "There have been concerns about Chris over the last couple of weeks now, Obviously things weren't totally together in his private life."

See also 
 Sport psychology
 Mental health in association football
 Depression in the Australian Football League

References

External links 
 Headspace
 Beyond Blue
 Yours truly
  AFL mental health policy
 Manage Your Mind Wellbeing Program

Australian rules football
Mental health in Australia
Sports medicine